Yury Rodnov (born 18 January 1961) is a Kazakhstani sports shooter. He competed in the men's 10 metre running target event at the 1996 Summer Olympics.

References

External links
 

1961 births
Living people
Kazakhstani male sport shooters
Olympic shooters of Kazakhstan
Shooters at the 1996 Summer Olympics
Place of birth missing (living people)